"Rise of the Turtles" is the 2-part series premiere of the 2012 Teenage Mutant Ninja Turtles animated series. The first part of the episodes aired on Nickelodeon on September 28, 2012, with the second part airing the following day.

The Turtles rise to the surface for the first time since being mutated, and witness the Kraang, a race of brain-like aliens with robotic bodies, capturing April O'Neil and her father, Kirby. The Turtles attempt to rescue the O'Neils while learning that the strange green ooze possessed by the Kraang could hold many secrets relating to their mutations.

Plot

Part 1
After having a training session, Splinter (Hamato Yoshi) and the Turtles celebrate their 15th anniversary of being mutated, and Splinter tells them the story of how they came to be. After the story, the Turtles convince Splinter to allow them to travel to the surface.

After taking a trip out of the sewers for the first time since being mutated, the Turtles witness April O'Neil and her father Kirby getting captured by The Kraang. Donatello develops a crush upon seeing April and concludes that the Turtles must save her and her father. The Turtles have a brief battle with the Kraang, but they are defeated since they aren't used to fighting as a team. As a result, the Kraang escape, with April and Kirby as their prisoners.

Back at the lair, Splinter agrees that the Turtles must save April and Kirby, and picks Leonardo as the leader of the team, much to Raphael's irritation.

Part 2
While searching for April and Kirby, they meet Snake, a guy who works for the Kraang. Raph threatens to pour mutagen on him if he doesn't tell the Turtles information about the Kraang. Snake confesses, telling them everything he knows, before Michelangelo accidentally lets him escape. At the lair, Splinter tells Leo that failure is a possibility that every leader must face, and tells him the story of how he and Oroku Saki, a.k.a. the Shredder were once friends, but became enemies.

The Turtles eventually find the Kraang, and Snake accidentally gets mutagen ooze poured on him, and becomes a mutated plant. The Turtles enters the Kraang's facility, and begin to battle them, but before they can reach April and Kirby, they come across Snake in his mutant form, which Mikey dubs "Snakeweed". Snakeweed is seeking revenge against the Turtles for his mutation, and they go on to fight him. Donnie goes on to save April and Kirby while Leo, Raph and Mikey continue to fight Snakeweed. Donnie manages to save April, but the Kraang escape with Kirby. Snakeweed eventually blows up and the Turtles and April escape from the Kraang. However, Snakeweed's heart starts beating again, indicating this isn't the last they'll see of him.

The Turtles made the news, but the Shredder watches the news back at Tokyo, Japan, discovering Splinter's symbol on the ninja shuriken, concluding that he and the Foot Clan must relocate to New York to finish off Splinter.

Reception
Max Nicholson of IGN gave "Rise of The Turtles" a rating of 8.5/10, saying "The action sequences are fluid, fast-paced and exciting, and the dialogue-heavy scenes are usually peppered with entertaining slapstick." Toon Zone reviewer Grant White gave the episode a positive review, saying "Although I enjoyed this premiere, not everything sat well with me. There are some parts of both the writing and animation that felt poor and sometimes overlapped." Noel Kirkpatrick at TV.com called the episode "a tad on the bland side". He cites that while there's plenty for surprises for the show's plot, "in laying the groundwork, this pilot didn't really do anything new". Matt Edwards at Den of Geek opined that the episode is "so polished and ell executed," and praised it for its balance of comedy and action, stating "A very strong start to the series, then, and one I’ve found myself revisiting frequently."

The episode's original run garnered approximately 3.9 million viewers within the United States.

References

External links

2012 American television episodes
Teenage Mutant Ninja Turtles (2012 TV series)
American television series premieres
Television episodes set in Tokyo
Television episodes set in New York City
Television episodes about revenge